Tomás Monfil (died 2009) was a Chilean forester, and one of the principal persons behind the reforestation program of CONAF in Aysén del General Carlos Ibáñez del Campo Region in the 1960s.

Sources
Homenaje al silvicultor Tómas Monfil
Homenaje Al Silvicultor Don Tómas Monfil

Forestry academics
Chilean foresters
2009 deaths
Year of birth missing
People from Aysén Region